HD 115337 is a binary star located in the northern circumpolar constellation Camelopardalis. The pair have a combined apparent magnitude of 6.25, placing it near the limit for naked eye visibility. Parallax measurements place the system at a distance of 698 light years.

The components have spectral classifications of K0 Ib and A8 V, indicating a K-type lower luminosity supergiant and an A-type main-sequence star (with uncertainty). At present the primary has 3.4 times the mass of the Sun and an enlarged radius of  due to its evolved status. HD 115337A is metal deficent, having an iron abundance only 74% of solar levels.

Ironically, the characteristics of HD 115337A belong to a giant star as opposed to a supergiant. It has even been classified as G5 III or G8 III, more consistent with the above properties. Nevertheless, optical measurements from Mason et al. (2001) find the pair to have a mean separation of an arcsecond along a position angle of 184°.

References

See also
 Red supergiant

Camelopardalis (constellation)
K-type supergiants
Double stars
Durchmusterung objects
115337
5009
064437